Tomoki Takata (高田 知季, born May 6, 1990) is a Japanese former professional baseball second baseman, and current rehabilitation coach for the Fukuoka SoftBank Hawks of Nippon Professional Baseball (NPB).

He previously played for the Fukuoka SoftBank Hawks.

Professional career
On October 25, 2012, Takata was drafted by the Fukuoka SoftBank Hawks in the 2012 Nippon Professional Baseball draft.

2013–2015 season
On March 25, 2013, Takata debuted in the Pacific League against the Saitama Seibu Lions, and he recorded his first hit on August 6. In 2013 season, he played in 11 games in the Pacific League.

On August 28, 2014, Takata recorded his first RBI hit. In 2014 season, he played in 12 games in the Pacific League.In the 2014 Japan Series against the Hanshin Tigers, he was selected as the Japan Series roster.

On April 23, 2015, Takada recorded multi hits at a three hits. And he recorded his first home run against the Yomiuri Giants in the Interleague play on June 7. In 2015 season, he finished the regular season in 81 games with a batting average of .237, a one home runs, a RBI of 11, and a 4 stolen bases. In the 2015 Japan Series against the Tokyo Yakult Swallows, He played in the Japan Series for the first time as a pinch runner in Game 5.

2016–2020 season
On September 29, 2016, Takada underwent shoulder surgery. n 2016 season, he had only played 36 games due to surgery.

In 2017 season, Takada's return to the team was postponed until June 13 due to rehabilitation. On July 18, he was interviewed with a home run and an RBI hit. He finished the regular season in 58 games with a batting average of .228, a two home runs, a RBI of 8, and a 2 stolen bases. In the 2017 Japan Series against the Yokohama DeNA BayStars, he was selected as the Japan Series roster.

Takata hit a two-run home run in a come-from-behind match against the Orix Buffaloes on May 4, 2018. In 2018 season, he finished the regular season in 74 games with a batting average of .188, a two home runs, a RBI of 15, and a 2 stolen bases. In the 2018 Pacific League Climax Series against the Hokkaido Nippon-Ham Fighters,he made an error, but hiting an RBI hiti n Game 2. In the 2018 Japan Series against the Hiroshima Toyo Carp, he recorded his first hit in the Japan Series.

On June 8, 2019, Takada recorded multi hits at a three hits, against the Hiroshima Toyo Carp in the Interleague play. And he recorded a squeeze bunt against Saitama Seibu Lions on September 12. He finished the regular season in 93 games with a batting average of .157, a RBI of 10, and a 2 stolen bases. In the 2019 Japan Series against the Yomiuri Giants, he was selected as the Japan Series roster.

On May 7, 2020, Takada underwent surgery on his left leg joint.  As a result, he was unable to play in the Pacific League for the 2020 season. In the 2020 Japan Series against the Yomiuri Giants, he was selected as the Japan Series roster.

2021–2022 season
In 2021 season, Takata finished the regular season in 61 games with a batting average of .231, and a RBI of 2, and a one stolen bases.

In 2022 season, he appeared in only 17 games. On October 30, Takata announced his retirement after the 2022 season.

After retirement
On October 31, 2022, The Fukuoka SoftBank Hawks announced that Takata will inauguration as rehabilitation coach from the 2023 season.

References

External links

 NPB.jp
 0 Tomoki Takata PLAYERS2022 - Fukuoka SoftBank Hawks Official site

1990 births
Living people
Baseball people from Hyōgo Prefecture
Japanese baseball players
Nippon Professional Baseball infielders
Fukuoka SoftBank Hawks players
Japanese baseball coaches
Nippon Professional Baseball coaches